Adam Sobczak (born 14 December 1989) is a Polish lightweight rower. He won a gold medal at the 2012 World Rowing Championships in Plovdiv with the lightweight men's quadruple scull.

References

1989 births
Living people
Polish male rowers
World Rowing Championships medalists for Poland
Sportspeople from Gdańsk